Panayiota Bertzikis is an author, public speaker, and women's rights activist.

Life and works
Panayiota Bertzikis is a United States Coast Guard veteran who founded the Military Rape Crisis Center in August 2006 while she was still on active duty. The Military Rape Crisis Center provides medical advocacy, support groups, legal services, case management, community education, and professional training to victims of military sexual trauma while fighting gender-based violence.

Bertzikis made claims of being sexually assaulted by a shipmate while serving in the United States Coast Guard in Burlington, Vermont and saw a lack of support and no substantial steps being made to investigate the matter from the authorities after her assault.  After her discharge from the Coast Guard for failure to adjust, she was awarded the Unsung Heroines of Massachusetts award by the Massachusetts Commission on the Status of Women in May 2010.

Bertzikis also runs the blog mydutytospeak.com. She has been awarded the Peter Vogel Gold Leadership Award (twice) and the Peter Vogel Silver Leadership Award.

See also
 UniteWomen.org

References

External links
 Military Rape Crisis Center - Executive director - Panayiota Bertzikis.

Living people
21st-century American women writers
Sexual assault in the United States military
Female United States Coast Guard personnel
1981 births
American women non-fiction writers
21st-century American non-fiction writers